The Coinage Act of 1849 was an Act of the United States Congress passed during the California Gold Rush authorizing the Mint to produce two new gold coins in response to the increased gold supply: the small gold dollar and the large double eagle worth twenty dollars. The Act also defined permissible variances in gold coinage.

Background

Legislation 
House Bill No. 746 was introduced by James Iver McKay on January 25, 1849. On February 20, 1849, the bill was reported by the United States House Committee on Ways and Means and taken up by the House for debate. The bill passed the House the same day and moved to consideration in the Senate. On March 3, 1849, the bill was reported by the United States Senate Committee on Finance and taken up by the Senate for debate. The bill passed the Senate the same day with amendments and was sent back to the House for consideration. The House agreed to the amendments and the bill was signed into law by President James K. Polk.

Effects

See also 

Coinage Act of 1792
Coinage Act of 1834
Coinage Act of 1853
Coinage Act of 1857
Coinage Act of 1864
Coinage Act of 1873
Coinage Act of 1965

References

External links 
Full text of act, An Act to Authorize the Coinage of Gold Dollars and Double Eagles. 30th Congress, 2d Session, Ch. 109. 9 Stat. 397

United States federal currency legislation
1849 in American law
1849 in the United States
1849 in economics